Magelhaens (crater) may refer to:

 Magelhaens (lunar crater)
 Magelhaens A, a satellite lunar crater
 Magelhaens (Martian crater)